Henriette Marie, Princess Palatine (17 July 1626 – 18 September 1651) was a daughter born to Elizabeth Stuart of Bohemia and Frederick V of the Palatinate. Before her death, she was the wife of Sigismund Rákóczi.

Early years
Henriette Marie, Princess Palatine, was the third daughter and ninth child borne to Frederick V, Elector Palatine and his wife, Elizabeth Stuart. Henriette was born in The Hague, Netherlands. Her parental grandparents were: Frederick IV, Elector Palatine and Louise Juliana of Nassau. Her maternal grandparents were: James VI and I of Scotland and Anne of Denmark.

Henriette was born when her parents, Frederick and Elizabeth, were in exile; due to this, her parents could hardly feed her. The family had to live off of Elizabeth's family funds and donations from her supporters.

Marriage

On 4 April 1651, in Sárospatak, Hungary, she was married to Sigismund Rákóczi, brother of George Rákóczi II, Prince of Transylvania.

Death
Henriette Marie died unexpectedly on 18 September 1651. Her husband followed her to the grave a few months later; both were buried in St. Michael's Church in Gyulafehérvár.

Ancestry

References 

1626 births
1651 deaths
17th-century German people
Daughters of kings